The 2000–01 Lithuanian Hockey League season was the 10th season of the Lithuanian Hockey League, the top level of ice hockey in Lithuania. Five teams participated in the league, and SC Energija won the championship. SC Energija received a bye until the finals, as they played in the Eastern European Hockey League.

Regular season

Final 
 SC Energija - Vyltis Elektrenai 5:0

External links
Season on hockeyarchives.info

Lithuanian Hockey League
Lithuania Hockey League seasons
Lith